Purple vetch is a common name for several plants and may refer to:

Vicia americana
Vicia benghalensis, native to southern Europe and north Africa